Gulin or Gulín is a surname. Notable people with the surname include:

Ángeles Gulín (1939–2002), Spanish operatic soprano
Eelis Gulin (1893–1975), Finnish professor and bishop
Lindsay Gulin (born 1976), American minor league baseball pitcher
Maksim Gulin (born 1997), Russian politician
Tonči Gulin (1938–1999), Croatian football player